Eudice Chong and Ye Qiuyu were the defending champions, but Ye chose not to participate. Chong partnered Zheng Wushuang, but lost in the first round to Feng Shuo and Guo Hanyu.

Jiang Xinyu and Tang Qianhui won the title, defeating Ankita Raina and Rosalie van der Hoek in the final, 6–4, 6–4.

Seeds

Draw

Draw

References

External Links
Main Draw

Liuzhou Open - Doubles